The Charles Krug Winery is a winery founded by Charles Krug in 1861. It was named to the National Register of Historic Places on November 8, 1974.

History 
Historically, Charles Krug introduced innovative ideas in California winemaking. He began making wine using a cider press for pressing, carefully selected rootstocks, varietals and vineyard sites. The knowledge he gained and shared benefited the young California wine industry. Following Krug's death, James Moffitt Sr. purchased the winery in 1894. In 1943, Robert Mondavi persuaded his parents, Cesare and Rosa Mondavi, to purchase the inactive winery from Moffitt for $75,000.

Present status 
The winery remains owned by the family of Peter Mondavi, Robert's brother.

References

External links

Agricultural buildings and structures on the National Register of Historic Places in California
Buildings and structures completed in 1881
Wineries in Napa Valley
1881 establishments in California